The Nokia 3300 is a mobile phone announced on March 11, 2003 as the successor of Nokia 5510. It was marketed primarily as a music playing phone.

They are relatively rare and today go for high prices in the second hand market.

Design
Unlike most traditional designs, the 3300 has a display roughly in the center of the front panel with a numeric keypad to the right, a controller pad to the left and the call/end and selection keys to the bottom. The covers are interchangeable, allowing the handset to be personalised to some extent. The 3300 bears strong design similarities to the Nokia N-Gage which was introduced before it, but released long after the 3300.

Nokia also made a variant of the phone for the North American market. Compared to the Eurasian version, the 3300b utilizes a QWERTY keyboard and runs on GSM 850/1900 networks.

Features
The Nokia 3300 supports MP3 and AAC audio and comes with an FM radio, and it can also be used as a digital voice recorder. Included in the standard package is a 64MB MMC memory card for storing data. GPRS data is supported, the display is a 128 x 128 pixel CSTN panel.

See also 
 Nokia 5510

References

3300
Mobile phones introduced in 2003